Events from the year 1757 in Canada.

Incumbents
French Monarch: Louis XV
British and Irish Monarch: George II

Governors
Governor General of New France: Pierre François de Rigaud, Marquis de Vaudreuil-Cavagnal
Colonial Governor of Louisiana: Louis Billouart
Governor of Nova Scotia: Charles Lawrence
Commodore-Governor of Newfoundland: Richard Edwards

Events
 Thursday March 17 to Tuesday March 22 - In four nights 1,500 Canadiens and Indians destroy the out-works of Fort William-Henry.
 Saturday July 30 - Seven thousand men are collected to attack Fort William Henry.
 Tuesday August 9 - The Fort, garrisoned by 2,200, capitulates. Violating the terms of capitulation, Indians kill, or recapture, many of the garrison, whereupon Montcalm exclaims: "Kill me, but spare the English who are under my protection."
 Of the 5,000 French soldiers expected, only 1,500 reach Canada.
 December - The troops, in Canada, complain of being fed on horse-flesh and too little bread.

Births
 June 22: George Vancouver, naval officer, explorer (d.1798)

Deaths
 November 2 : Louis Coulon de Villiers, military officer.

Historical documents
After three "melancholy" years of fighting in North America, outlook for British arms in 1757 is not encouraging (Note: "savage" used)

Returning to Lake George from action on Lake Champlain in January, Rogers' Rangers are ambushed but hold off and escape larger French force

Lord Loudoun, with intelligence that French will sit tight at Quebec, advises his Lake George commander to attack nearby French garrisons

Because of French fleet's strength and British fleet's delayed arrival, Loudoun's council of war cancels Louisbourg expedition

In August, Montcalm takes Fort William Henry on Lake George, then his Indigenous allies plunder and kill most of garrison, women and children

Loudoun's detailed plan (equipment, provisions, transport) for winter offensive against French on Lake Champlain

Detailed description of Quebec City's physical and defensive arrangement, plus advice on navigation, landing and French fire rafts

Nova Scotia needs civil government of fewer officers, and also fewer lawyers, they being "not esteemed the best Friends to an infant Settlement"

Pennsylvania Assembly complains about £2,385 it expended "in supporting the Inhabitants of Nova-Scotia, which[...]ought to be a national Expence."

Board of Trade sympathizes with Nova Scotia over attacks by remaining Acadians, and deportees that other colonies are letting return north

John Knox learns 48 Acadian families of Annapolis River had escaped to mountains and were supporting themselves with "robbing and plundering"

Mi'qmaw siblings Clare and Anselm Thomas from "Pan-nook" near Lunenburg arrange reconciliation with British (Note: "squaw" and "savages" used)

Newcomer Knox at Fort Cumberland finds early October weather not too hot or cold, but oldtimers know "rigorous winter" will come

References 

 
Canada
57